Catoptria orientellus is a species of moth in the family Crambidae. It is found in Romania.

References

Moths described in 1850
Crambini
Moths of Europe